"Gunga Din" is an 1890 poem by Rudyard Kipling.

Gunga Din may also refer to:

Gunga Din (film), 1939 film
Gunga Din (motorcycle)
The Gunga Din, an American rock band
"The Ballad of Gunga Din", a song from the Jim Croce album Facets (1966) 
"Gunga Din", a song from the Byrds album Ballad of Easy Rider (1969)
"Gunga Din", a song from the Libertines album Anthems for Doomed Youth (2015)